Sam Frazier, Jr. (August 12, 1943 – March 23, 2021) was an American blues singer, songwriter, guitarist and harmonica player.

Early life 
Sam Frazier, Jr. was born in a mining town of Edgewater, Alabama, a small mining community near Birmingham. His parents were Teretta and Sam Frazier, Sr. Sam had four sisters and one brother. His father was a coal miner and many of the stories he brought home influenced his career as a songwriter and performer. After observing the hard life his father endured, the one thing Sam knew that he did not want to be was a coal miner. To help earn money for a growing family, Sam's mother would hold big back yard barbecues on Friday night, which most times lasted until early Saturday morning. Although it was illegal, she operated a "shot house", selling liquor from the home. As a result of the large crowds that the barbecue and liquor sales drew, entertainers started coming by and playing for the crowd for donations, free barbecue and liquor. 

Sonny Boy Williamson was a regular and Jimmy Reed also came by. Sam was fascinated with the harmonica and it was Williamson who gave Sam his first harmonica and gave him a lesson in the blues harmonica technique. When there were no entertainers, a "Rock' Ola" juke box provided the music. Sam attended Edgewater Elementary school through 9th grade. At the tenth grade level, he attended Westfield High School. At the age of 17, Same went to stay with his uncle Willie Perry in Linden, Alabama. His uncle managed a large plantation. It was here that Sam got a real taste of country living, complete with picking cotton, bailing hay, and milking cows. While in Linden, Sam attended and completed high school at Linden Academy.

Career 
To earn extra money, Sam worked part-time at a local restaurant. One of his co-workers knew somebody who played in a blues band. Sam auditioned for the band and promptly was hired to play harmonica and sing. Some three months later, Sam moved back to Birmingham. He started playing as a one-man band: playing guitar and blowing the harmonica. He added a bass drum and hi-hat which he played with his feet. He taught his sister to play bass and she started performing with Sam at parties and local clubs. While playing at a club, he caught the ear of a popular local Birmingham DJ, "The Thin Man," Maurice King. King arranged an audition with a talent agent who took Sam and his sister to New York City and recorded his first record entitled "You Got Me Uptight". The session took place at a studio on Broadway. The 45 rpm single was released and received moderate airplay and success. While in New York City, Sam and his sister performed at the Sonia Ballroom. 

Eventually Sam came back to Birmingham and joined a gospel group, "The Golden Hummingbirds," where he played bass and sang. He also formed a three-piece combo and played at the DAV (Disabled Veterans) and American Legion for a period of time, and got a job at a local auto dealership. One of the salesmen introduced Sam to a local morning TV host, Country Boy Eddie. Eddie was a celebrity entertainer who eventually hired Sam as one of the regular members of his traveling entourage. They made appearances at local shopping malls, new car dealership grand openings and other venues. 

It was around that same time that Charley Pride rose to prominence in country music. Eddie encouraged Sam to pursue country music in addition to the blues music. Sam also became a regular on The Country Boy Eddie TV Show on WBRC TV in Birmingham, Alabama. Some of the members of the band entered Sam in a contest at "Sonny Duke's Night Club." Sam not only won the contest, but went on to perform at Sonny Duke's as a regular for five years. Then Sam met Joe Mitchell, owner of Missile Records, and recorded 12 songs with Sam in Nashville. One of the songs, "Cabbage Man," was released as a single and was well received by its airplay.

1970s 
In 1970, Sam recorded several songs that were released on Neal Hemphill's Goodie Train record label out of Birmingham, Alabama.  Although Sam was not signed as an exclusive artist to that label, Goodie Train released "Take Me Back," "Set Me Free," "I've Been Hurt," "Don't Spread Your Love Around," "Momma Said She Ain't Here," "Drippin' Honey," and "I Don't Want Another Love." In 1974 Sam went to Nashville and auditioned to appear on the nationally syndicated TV show, "You Can Be A Star." Sam was selected to perform and won the first round of competition singing the Billy Joe Shaver song "An Old Chunk of Coal."

1980s 
While in Nashville, Sam also appeared at "Fan Fare." Sam was spotted by a talent agent who booked him to appear at Gilley's Supper Club in Pasadena, Texas. Also on the venue at Gilley's was Gene Watson. Sam's first big foray in the blues arena came in 1987. Sam booked a session at Sound of Birmingham recording studios in Birmingham, Alabama and over a six-month period he and studio owner/producer Don Mosley finished an entire album which was released on the "Blue Rock" label out of Torrence, California. In support of that release, Sam moved to California and appeared at venues around the state. While in California, Sam also performed with Johnny Otis in "The Johnny Otis Revue."

1990s 
On a return visit to Birmingham, Sam met record producer Fred Sollie, the owner of Independent Record Label, Sollie Sunshine Records. Fred signed Sam to a two-year contract. Over that period of time, Fred and Sam co-wrote eight songs. Out of that collaboration came the song "Forty Acres of Hillside Mountain Land" which was released in 1991 and became a No.1 hit on the independent record charts. The second release, "Momma Kept The Lamp Light Burning," received international airplay and can be found on radio station play lists as far away as Australia. Also released was "A Road Walked By Fools," "Crying Melody" and "Leaving You Would Be A Sin."

2000s-death 
Sam Frazier appeared for a number of years with tribute artist Gilbert Gauthier in Las Vegas, Nevada. In Las Vegas, they performed tribute shows to Neil Diamond and Frank Sinatra. Sam, however, always appeared as himself. In 2006, he moved back to Birmingham to attend to family matters. Shortly after his return, his older sister and younger brother died. Since that time, Sam worked steadily on a new blues project with producers Don Mosley and Les Alexander at the Sound of Birmingham Studios in Birmingham, Alabama.

In 2017, Music Maker released the album, Take Me Back, containing 16 tracks.

Sam Frazier died on March 23, 2021 of heart failure after a period of hospital treatment for diabetes and a lung infection.

References 
 Mosley, Don (July 25, 2011) "Sam Frazier, Jr.. Transmedia Music
 The Birmingham Sound (August 28, 2009) Bhamwiki

External links 
  (1987, The Country Boy Eddie Show)
  (1987, The Country Boy Eddie Show)
 Sam Frazier, Jr. Bhamwiki
 Sam Frazier, Jr. Extraction Interview at WBHM 90.3 F.M.

1943 births
2021 deaths
American blues guitarists
American male guitarists
American blues harmonica players
Blues musicians from Alabama
Guitarists from Alabama
20th-century American guitarists
20th-century American male musicians